Anthonis is a Dutch masculine given name and a surname that is popular in the Provinces of the Netherlands, Belgium, Suriname, South Africa, Namibia, and Indonesia. Notable people with this name include the following:

Given name
Anthonis Mor van Dashorst, also known as Antonis Mor (c. 1517 – 1577), Dutch painter
Anthonis van Obbergen (1543 – 1611), Flemish architect

Surname
Lode Anthonis (1922 – 1992), Belgian cyclist
P. R. Anthonis (1911 – 2009), Sri Lankan surgeon

See also

Anthoni
Stefan Anthonisz
Antonis

Notes

Dutch masculine given names